Heteroderis is a genus of flowering plants in the family Asteraceae.

Species
There is only one known species, Heteroderis pusilla, native to Egypt, Saudi Arabia, Iraq, Iran, Afghanistan, Pakistan, Turkmenistan, Kyrgyzstan, Uzbekistan, Tajikistan, and Kazakhstan.

References

Cichorieae
Flora of temperate Asia
Flora of Egypt
Monotypic Asteraceae genera
Taxa named by Pierre Edmond Boissier